Sacha Schneider (born 23 June 1972) is one of Luxemburger's most experienced football players. Now retired from playing.

International career
He is a member of the Luxembourg national football team from 1995 to 2003.

External links
 

1972 births
Living people
Luxembourgian footballers
Luxembourg international footballers
CS Grevenmacher players
Jeunesse Esch players

Association football midfielders